Chen Ke (born 26 March 1997) is a Chinese table tennis player. Her highest career ITTF ranking was 30.

References

1997 births
Living people
Chinese female table tennis players